Melaka and George Town, Historic Cities of the Straits of Malacca is a UNESCO World Heritage listing comprising the historic urban centres of two cities, Melaka and George Town, that illustrate 500 years of cultural and trade exchange between East and West.

This World Heritage site illustrates the development of maritime urban settlements in the region over time and the contributions of diverse ethnic and cultural groups in developing these cities. The government buildings, churches, squares and fortifications of Melaka demonstrate the early stages of this history originating in the 15th-century Malay sultanate, which was followed by Portuguese and Dutch periods of control beginning in the early 16th century. George Town represents the British era from the end of the 18th century and features residential and commercial buildings of the period. In both cities, the cultural and architectural contributions of local Malays as well as Chinese and South Asian immigrants can be seen, and their own evolutions traced over times as well.

Melaka was inscribed in the listing using the Malay language spelling of the name, as opposed to the more traditional English language spelling of its name, "Malacca".

Inscription criteria

The listing was inscribed on the basis of Criterion (ii), "exhibit an important interchange of human values", as the two cities are examples of multicultural trading forged from the exchange of Malay, Chinese and Indian cultures, and three successive European colonial powers over almost 500 years; Criterion (iii): "bearing unique testimony to a cultural tradition", as the cities’ multicultural heritage is expressed through the great variety of religious buildings of many faiths, ethnic quarters, languages, and festivals; and Criterion (iv): "an outstanding example of a type of building or landscape which illustrates a significant stage in human history", as Malacca and George Town reflect a mixture of influences which created a unique architecture, culture and townscape without parallel anywhere in East and Southeast Asia.

Inscription history
The listing was originally added to Malaysia’s Tentative List for World Heritage in 2001. The site was inscribed on the list in 2008 by the World Heritage Committee at its 32nd session in Quebec City, Canada.

Singapore and Phuket, also located on the Strait of Malacca, share a history of multicultural colonial development very similar to that of Melaka and George Town and were assessed for possible inclusion in the listing. However, Singapore’s historic core underwent extensive demolition and redevelopment during the 1970s and 1980s, and remaining historic properties lack the integrity necessary for consideration. Phuket’s historical core is considerably smaller and lacks the rich built heritage found in Melaka and George Town.

A minor boundary adjustment was made to the Melaka buffer zone to incorporate the gazetted Chinese cemetery in the Bukit Cina area, as had been recommended in ICOMOS’ original report in 2008.

ICOMOS identified the main threats to the property to be tourism development pressure and traffic. In the longer term, climate change and rising sea levels may create flooding problems. ICOMOS recommended that these issues be addressed specifically in future management plans.

See also
Straits Settlements

References

External links 
Official website (in Malay)
"Melaka and George Town, Historic Cities of the Straits of Malacca"
"The Criteria for Selection"

World Heritage Sites in Malaysia